Cheryl Cohen-Greene  (born September 9, 1944) is an American sexual surrogate partner, speaker, and author, known for her work with American poet Mark O'Brien in 1986, before his death in 1999. She was portrayed in the film The Sessions by Helen Hunt, who received an Academy Award nomination for her performance. In 2012, Cohen-Greene released her memoire, titled An Intimate Life: Sex, Love, and My Journey as a Surrogate Partner.

Personal life 
Cohen-Greene was raised in Salem, Massachusetts, the daughter of Virginia (née Cote 1924–2002) and Robert Theriault (1921–2012). She has two brothers, David, a dentist, and Peter, an artist. She was raised Roman Catholic and converted to Judaism after marrying her first husband, Michael Cohen in 1964. They had an open marriage. Cohen-Greene has a son, Allan, and a daughter, Jessica, from her first marriage, and several grandchildren. Her second husband is Bob Greene, a former client, Vietnam war veteran, and retired postal worker. She began working as a sex surrogate partner in 1973 and also worked as a nude artist's model. She is a breast cancer and lymphoma survivor and also has dyslexia. Cohen-Greene graduated from Salem High School and then attended the Institute for Advanced Study of Human Sexuality in San Francisco.

Career 
She first thought of becoming a sex surrogate partner after reading Surrogate Wife: The Story of a Masters & Johnson Sexual Therapist and the Nine Cases She Treated by Valerie Scott. In 1973 she took San Francisco Sex Information's (SFSI) training, and was a member of their training staff for 20 years. She studied the work of Masters and Johnson, and works with many of the San Francisco Bay Area's premiere sex therapists.

Cohen Greene is a certified Clinical Sexologist and a sex surrogate partner. Her official title is Surrogate Partner Therapist. She is a member of IPSA (International Professional Surrogates Association). In October 2004 she received her 'Doctorate in Human Sexuality' from the Institute for Advanced Study of Human Sexuality in San Francisco. She has stated about her profession: "People have asked me over the years, 'How do you work with people who are differently abled?' I always say, it's not hard for me. I just have to learn what their special needs are." She has appeared on shows like Larry King Live, the Joy Behar Show and The Jeff Probst Show discussing her profession. The National Geographic show Taboos episode "Forbidden Love" (Season 7, Episode 6, first aired 2011) featured her in one of its segments. Also, the Discovery Fit & Health documentary My Sex Surrogate, first aired in 2013, follows a woman and a man as they each work with a sex surrogate; she was the surrogate who worked with the man.

References

External links 
 

1944 births
Living people
American sex workers
Converts to Judaism from Roman Catholicism
Sex therapists
Writers from Berkeley, California
Writers from Salem, Massachusetts
Writers from the San Francisco Bay Area
Salem High School (Massachusetts) alumni
Writers with dyslexia